The seventh season of the television series Dallas aired on CBS during the 1983–84 TV season.

Cast

Starring
In alphabetical order:
 Barbara Bel Geddes as Miss Ellie Ewing (19 episodes)
 Patrick Duffy as Bobby Ewing (30 episodes)
 Linda Gray as Sue Ellen Ewing (30 episodes)
 Larry Hagman as J.R. Ewing (30 episodes)
 Susan Howard as Donna Culver Krebbs (28 episodes)
 Steve Kanaly as Ray Krebbs (28 episodes)
 Ken Kercheval as Cliff Barnes (30 episodes)
 Victoria Principal as Pamela Barnes Ewing (30 episodes)
 Charlene Tilton as Lucy Ewing Cooper (29 episodes)

Also Starring
 Morgan Brittany as Katherine Wentworth (29 episodes)
 John Beck as Mark Graison (26 episodes)
 Audrey Landers as Afton Cooper (25 episodes)
 Priscilla Beaulieu Presley as Jenna Wade (24 episodes), billed under "Guest Star" status for her first seven episodes 
 Howard Keel as Clayton Farlow (22 episodes)
 Timothy Patrick Murphy as Mickey Trotter (6 episodes)

Special Guest Star
 Christopher Atkins as Peter Richards (27 episodes)
 Barry Corbin as Sheriff Fenton Washburn (1 episode)

Notable guest stars
Omri Katz joins the supporting cast as the second actor to play John Ross Ewing III, and Alexis Smith (Lady Jessica Montford), Glenn Corbett (Paul Morgan), Barry Jenner (Dr. Jerry Kenderson), Martin E. Brooks (Edgar Randolph), Daniel Pilon (Naldo Marchetta), Bill Morey (Leo Wakefield), Shalane McCall (Charlie Wade), Pat Colbert (Oil Baron's Club hostess Dora Mae), Marina Rice (Pam's maid Angela), and Tony Garcia (the longest serving actor to portray Southfork servant Raoul) are also added.

Crew 
The number of writers employed on this season is dramatically decreased from previously, with only three active writers throughout the season: showrunner Leonard Katzman, and longtime Dallas writers Arthur Bernard Lewis and David Paulsen.

The production team remains the same for the third consecutive year: Philip Capice serves as executive producer, Katzman as producer, Cliff Fenneman as associate producer, and writer Arthur Bernard Lewis as supervising producer. Additionally, writer David Paulsen continues as story editor.

DVD release
Dallas' season seven was released by Warner Bros. Home Video, on a Region 1 DVD box set of five double-sided DVDs, on July 31, 2007. In addition to the 30 episodes, it also includes the featurette "The Music of Dallas".

Episodes

References

General references

External links 

1983 American television seasons
1984 American television seasons
Dallas (1978 TV series) seasons